Thomas George Bridewell (born 8 August 1988 in Etchilhampton, Wiltshire) is an English motorcycle racer in the British Superbike Championship aboard a Ducati Panigale V4 R. Following several seasons with Oxford Products, for 2023 he will switch to Paul Bird Racing on a factory-supported Ducati.

During the 2018 season, while competing on a Suzuki GSX-R1000R, his contract was terminated abruptly by his team during practice for the Snetterton Circuit round in June. However in July, after missing two rounds, Bridewell was able to step into the vacant Ducati Panigale seat at Moto Rapido Racing, caused by Taylor Mackenzie leaving earlier by mutual agreement.

For the remainder of 2018 Bridewell returned the team's best results in the Superbike class, scoring four podium finishes, narrowly missing out on a Showdown place and achieving the Riders' Cup at the season finale. Bridewell was retained from 2019 to 2022 with the same team under a new sponsor name.

His best championship standing to date came when he finished third in the British Superbike 2014 season, behind Ryuichi Kiyonari and winner Shane Byrne. He was a runner-up in the Yamaha R6 Cup of 2005.

Tommy is the younger brother of Ollie Bridewell, who was a prominent up-and-coming motorcycle racer when he died in 2007 during the Mallory Park round of the Superbike Championship.

Biography

Ollie's death
For the 2007 season, Tommy and his older brother Ollie joined forces for the British Superbike Championship in team NB Suzuki. Ollie died after crashing during a practice session at the Mallory Park round in 2007. He was pronounced dead at the scene. Bridewell left the Championship at that round.

European Superstock 600
Bridewell restarted his racing career in Italy during 2008, moving on to the European Superstock 600 class in 2009, riding the Lorenzini Yamaha. Bridewell started off with a 13th place in the first round at Valencia but would fail to score any more points finishes, and left the team mid-season.

Return to British Superbike Championship

2009
After departing the European scene, Bridewell returned to the British Superbike Championship during the 2009 season, competing in the Privateers' Cup on a Team NB Suzuki, winning the Cup class in 7 of the 26 races. Following this success, he was signed by Quay Garage Honda to compete in the main British Superbike Championship for the 2010 season.

2010
Bridewell had a mixed start to the season, crashing twice in the first round at Brands Hatch Indy circuit, then failing to start the next round at Thruxton. He recovered from this to score a career best fourth-place finish during the fourth round at Cadwell Park. Bridewell finished the season in 11th place on 105 points, his best finish in the Championship.

2011
For 2011 Bridewell remained with the Quay Garage team, rebranded under the Tyco Racing banner. His season started strongly with a podium in the first race at Brands Hatch Indy. However, he crashed heavily in practice at Thruxton, leading to the amputation of his little finger. He took a fourth place in race 2 at Cadwell Park, having injured himself in practice for the second round at Oulton Park, and never showed in the top 10 again. On the Wednesday before the Snetterton round, Bridewell and Tyco Honda parted company. Bridewell was signed up to replace James Westmoreland at Motorpoint Yamaha for the last four rounds of the 2011 championship season.

British Superbikes

Bridewell rode with Shaun Muir Racing as a temporary replacement rider for part of 2013, followed by a full season in 2014. For 2015 he joined Tyco BMW.

Endurance racing
Bridewell participated in the 2018 Suzuka 8 Hours solo motorcycle endurance race riding a Suzuki GSX-R1000R for Japanese team S-Pulse Dream Racing IAI. With two other riders, the team finished fourth.

World Superbikes
Bridewell was drafted in to replace injured rider Eugene Laverty on the Go Eleven Ducati in May 2019 for the races at Imola, Italy, on a similar bike to his BSB machine. He finished 12th in Race 1, scoring 4 World Championship points, and 11th in the sprint-distance Superpole Race, just outside of the points. Race 2 was cancelled due to heavy rain. In late May, it was confirmed Bridewell would again replace Laverty, at the Jerez, Spain event in June, when he again finished in the points from both full-length races.

Career statistics
Stats correct as of 17 October 2021

By championship

British Superbike Championship

Superbike World Championship

References

External links
 Rider profile from British Superbike official website

1988 births
Living people
English motorcycle racers
British Superbike Championship riders
People from Wiltshire
Superbike World Championship riders
125cc World Championship riders
FIM Superstock 1000 Cup riders